The Dying Earth is a collection of fantasy short fiction by American writer Jack Vance, published by Hillman in 1950. Vance returned to the setting in 1965 and thereafter, making it the first book in the Dying Earth series. It is retitled Mazirian the Magician in its Vance Integral Edition (2005), after the second of six collected stories.

The Internet Speculative Fiction Database calls it a "slightly connected series of stories" but it was ranked number 16 of 33 "All Time Best Fantasy Novels" by Locus in 1987, based on a poll of subscribers. Similarly, it was one of five finalists for the Best Novel "Retro Hugo" in 2001 when the World Science Fiction Society provided 50th anniversary recognition for a publication year without Hugo Awards.

Contents

All six stories were original to the collection.
 "Turjan of Miir". The wizard Turjan seeks to create living beings, but his experiments fail. For advice he turns to the wizard Pandelume, who promises him training in return for a magical gem.
 "Mazirian the Magician". Mazirian chases T'sain, who aims to trap him and save her lover.
 "T'sais". T'sais searches Earth for beauty, but finds justice.
 "Liane the Wayfarer". Liane searches for the heart's desire of a witch, and meets Chun the Unavoidable.
 "Ulan Dhor". Ulan Dhor is sent on a magical mission to the fabled city of Ampridatvir.
 "Guyal of Sfere". Guyal's thirst for knowledge draws him to the Museum of Man.

Setting

The stories are  set in a far future Earth when the Sun is nearing the end of its life. The sky ranges from pink to deep blue, lit by a dim red Sun, and strange plants and animals exist. Much of the book is set within the forested country of Ascolais and in the ruined cities covering the landscape.

The setting is marked by the presence of ancient ruins and other fragments of decayed civilizations. The human population is shrinking, and most live in structures built long ago, in varying degrees of ruin, squalor, or luxury. Many also make use of technology or magic which was created long ago but which they no longer understand. No distinction is ever made between technology created through science and that created by magic; the line between the two is blurred, and it is implied that the two are ultimately indistinguishable. The characters know they live on a "Dying Earth" and often make carefree, nihilistic references to the fact that their planet does not have much longer to live. It is never explained how long the Earth has left to live.

Many of the most important people in Ascolais are wizards. In the Dying Earth, wizards use magic by memorizing lengthy formulas for spells and activating them by speaking the proper commands. Once cast, the spell formula is forgotten, requiring the wizard to reread and re-memorize them. This concept for magic use was influential on other creators like Gary Gygax; it formed the basis of the entire magic system in the Gygax's game Dungeons & Dragons.
 
Because even talented wizards can only memorize and "load" a handful of spells, wizards also have to rely on magical relics and their other talents for protection. There are only one hundred spells which are still known to mankind, of thousands which were discovered over the course of history. Pandelume implies that "magic" has a scientific origin; many spells were invented through the use of mathematics.

Characters

Title characters

Guyal: Guyal of Sfere is a young, wealthy man who is famous among his people for endlessly asking questions, due to a "void" in his mind which compels him to seek knowledge. Eventually, his father grants him magical boons to protect him, so that he can seek the fabled Museum of Man in order to ask questions of the legendary, all-knowing Curator.
Liane: A "bandit-troubadour", Liane the Wayfarer, as he calls himself, is a vain, venal, overconfident, and thoroughly psychotic adventurer. He travels about seeking wealth, wine, women, and song. In order to win the affections of a beautiful witch, he sets out to steal a tapestry from a mysterious entity called Chun the Unavoidable.
Mazirian: A greedy and heartless wizard, Mazirian will stop at nothing to obtain as much magical knowledge and power as possible. Although Mazirian, like Turjan, is capable of creating artificial life, his creations lack human intelligence. He imprisons Turjan in order to force him to give up his secrets.
Turjan: Turjan is a wizard who lives in the castle of Miir, where he keeps the books which contain the 100 spells which remain in human knowledge. At the beginning of the book, Turjan travels to an otherworldly realm to study under the wizard Pandelume, who can teach Turjan the secret of creating artificial life, as well as spells and sciences which are lost to human knowledge. Turjan's adventures often bring him into conflict with other wizards.
T'sais: T'sais is an artificial woman created by Pandelume. Unfortunately, something went wrong in the process of her creation. As a result, T'sais is literally incapable of being pleased with anything or anyone, and reacts with disgust to the sight, sound, etc. of everything she perceives. She is consumed with uncontrollable disgust and hatred for all living creatures, including herself, and spends her time attempting to hunt and kill everything in sight (except Pandelume). After an encounter with T'sain, she decides to attempt to control her instinctual hatred, and asks Pandelume to send her to Earth. There, she joins Etarr in an attempt to cure their respective ills.
Ulan Dhor: Ulan is the nephew of Prince Kandive, and a budding swordsman and wizard. He sets out to the city of Ampridatvir to recover a pair of ancient tablets supposed to provide access to ancient knowledge and magic.

Other characters

Elai: Elai is a girl who shows kindness to Ulan Dhor when he journeys to Ampridatvir. She is a member of the grey-clad worshippers of Cazdal. Ulan informs her of the truth about the city, and she serves as his guide and companion. She is, however, unable to see anybody wearing green clothes.
Etarr: Etarr is a normal man who was unfortunate enough to fall in love with an evil witch. She used her magic powers to exchange his face with that of a demon, cursing him with an unspeakably horrible face. However, Etarr is a kind man. After he offers help and hospitality to T'sais, she joins him on a journey to force his ex-lover to return his face. Although Etarr is not spoken of as a magician, he knows some spells which he uses to protect himself and T'sais.
Kandive: Prince Kandive the Golden, as he is called, is a decadent and indolent monarch who rules the city of Kaiin. He is also a wizard of considerable power, from whom Mazirian stole the secrets of unnaturally long life. His age is unknown. Kandive finances the expeditions of his nephew, Ulan Dhor.
Pandelume: Pandelume is a mighty wizard who resides in the realm of Embelyon. Pandelume possesses knowledge of many things which are otherwise lost to mankind in Turjan's time, including the method of creating artificial life, of all the spells which have ever been invented, and of mundane sciences such as mathematics. However, he is not perfect or infallible; he created the flawed T'sais and needs Turjan to retrieve a magical relic for him in order to defeat an old foe. His personality is notably rational and reasonable for a wizard in the setting. Although he has a physical presence, Pandelume is never seen by the other characters; apparently, the sight of him causes insanity or death.
Shierl: Shierl is the daughter of the Castellan of the Saponids. When the Saponids force Guyal, as part of a three-part punishment for an act of desecration, to choose the most beautiful young woman in Saponce, he chooses Shierl, and inadvertently condemns her, along with himself, to be sacrificed to the demon Blikdak. Guyal and Shierl develop a relationship as the Saponids force him to escort her to the Museum of Man.
T'sain: T'sain is a beautiful artificial human woman created by Turjan. T'sain was created from the same "pattern" that Pandelume used to create T'sais, but T'sain does not share her mental flaws. T'sain returns with Turjan to the Dying Earth, and later attempts to rescue Turjan from Mazirian.

Places

Ampridatvir: Ampridatvir is, like Kaiin, an ancient city whose people now dwell in its half-ruins. Although many of the buildings are crumbling, much of its ancient technology is still usable, such as moving walkways and anti-gravity elevators. The city was once a highly advanced civilization where all needs were met by technology and magic, ruled by the wizard Rogol Domedonfors. However, the city fell into decline because of the bickering between two cults, the worshippers of the god Pansiu and the worshippers of the god Cazdal. Before dying, Rogol created two tablets which, when combined, would provide the secrets of his power. He gave one tablet to the leader of each sect.

The people of Ampridatvir now live under a curse. The worshippers of Pansiu wear green, and cannot see any person wearing grey, while the worshippers of Cazdal wear grey, and cannot see anyone wearing green. As a result, the two sides are completely unaware of one another's existence. In accordance with tradition, glory-seekers dress themselves in red and attempt to retrieve the tablet of the opposing side. Little do they realize that this will make them visible to everyone, and doom them to being killed by invisible attackers. The people rationalize this by assuming that the red-wearers are killed by ghosts.

Ascolais: Ascolais is a forested country where Turjan, Mazirian, and many other wizards and strange creatures reside. Part of it is under the rule of Kandive.
Embelyon: Embelyon is a realm removed from the Dying Earth; it may be located in a different solar system or on another plane of existence entirely. It is the dwelling-place of Pandelume, who retains access to the many spells and arts which human civilization has lost. It is described as a fantastical landscape with many unearthly plants and animals, and a sky of shifting prismatic colours.
Kaiin: Kaiin is a city on the edge of Ascolais, ruled by Prince Kandive the Golden. The city is thousands of years old, and its people live in its habitable ruins. Despite this, the few remaining people are relatively well-educated and sophisticated, though Kandive derides them as a decadent people who are merely finding extravagant ways to occupy their time.
Saponce: Saponce is the city of the Saponids, a people who are ruled by ancient traditions. Their belief system is based on the premise that because the past was more glorious and civilized than the present, they must follow ancient traditions without ever questioning or knowing why. Their society is governed by extremely complex and rigid rules of decorum, and they impose ridiculously complicated (usually torturous and lethal) punishments on strangers who break their rules.

Creatures of the Dying Earth

Chun the Unavoidable: Chun is a mysterious entity who lives in abandoned ruins north of Kaiin. His species is unknown. Chun kills and steals the eyes of anyone who attempts to steal from him, and pursues his foes relentlessly.
Deodands: Deodands are humanoids which look like handsome, muscular human men, but with "dead black lusterless skin and long slit eyes." They are strong, murderous, and carnivorous creatures, but can be killed with offensive spells, which they fear. In Cugel's Saga, the wizard Follinense believes they are a mixture of basilisk, wolverine, and man. Deodands are notably eloquent. 
Pelgranes: Pelgranes are humanoids with beaked heads and wings, who harass, kill and eat travelers. They are known, unlike the eloquent Deodands they are often contrasted with, for being gullible, brash, and unintelligent.
Gauns: Gauns are roughly humanoid creatures which haunt the streets of Ampridatvir by night, capturing and eating any human they can catch. They are large, slow, powerful, unintelligent creatures with pale skin, furry legs, fanged mouths, and arms as long as a man is tall.
Oasts: Oasts are creatures which appear to be very tall humans with blonde hair and blue eyes, but are actually no more intelligent than livestock, and are kept as such. Some tribes to the north of Ascolais use them as food, mounts, and beasts of burden.
Twk-Men: The Twk-Men are tiny greenish men who ride on dragonflies. They are useful sources of information, and are willing to sell their knowledge. By the same token, they can be bribed to lie to others. The usual form of payment is salt, which they crave for unexplained reasons.
Sandestins: Creatures comparable to jinn who, despite being extremely powerful, are easily compelled against their will to serve magicians. Sandestins allow mages to perform certain powerful spells without having to memorize syllables. They are fully aware they are superior to their masters in magic ability, which only adds to the resentment they feel.

Influence on Dungeons and Dragons 

The Dying Earth was featured in the Advanced Dungeons & Dragons Dungeon Master’s Guide under Appendix N: Literature as one of the works that were read during the development of the game system. The designer, Gary Gygax, also credited the novel with being the inspiration for the magic system, which he called "Vancian".

See also
The Dying Earth Roleplaying Game, Pelgrane Press (2001). A tabletop roleplaying game based on the novel series.

References

External links

Dying Earth
Short story collections by Jack Vance
Fantasy short story collections
Picaresque novels
1950 short story collections
1950 science fiction novels